Chris Obzansky (born December 13, 1983) is an American former competitive ice dancer.

Career
With partner Lydia Manon, Obzansky competed domestically in the novice and junior ranks. They won the silver medal at the 1999 United States Figure Skating Championships.

With Kendra Goodwin, he is the 2001 U.S. junior national silver medalist. They placed 15th at the 2001 World Junior Figure Skating Championships. They won the 2000 Junior Grand Prix event in China.

Obzansky, chose to end the partnership with Goodwin in February, 2003 in order to serve as a missionary in the Baltics. After his return, he announced he would once again team up with Goodwin to compete in the 2005/2006 season. However, they never made it to Nationals.

He teamed up with Mimi Whetstone in 2006. They placed 10th at the 2007 United States Figure Skating Championships and 8th at the 2008 United States Figure Skating Championships. They were coached by Igor Shpilband and Marina Zoueva. That partnership ended in 2008.

Obzansky announced a new partnership with Trina Pratt in the summer of 2008. They announced the end of their partnership in 2010.

Personal life 
Obzansky is married and lives in Utah.

Competitive highlights

With Pratt

With Whetstone

With Goodwin

With Manon

References

External links
 
 2007 Nationals bio
 
 Shanna Ghaznavi, "Ice Dreams", New Era, January 2004.

American male ice dancers
1983 births
Living people
Latter Day Saints from Delaware
American Mormon missionaries
21st-century Mormon missionaries
Mormon missionaries in Estonia
Mormon missionaries in Latvia
Mormon missionaries in Lithuania
Sportspeople from Wilmington, Delaware